Ahorntal is a municipality in the district of Bayreuth in the state (Bundesland) of Bavaria in Germany.

Ahorntal is known for its generally temperate weather. The town focuses on environmental conservation. Tourism provides revenue for the local economy.

References

Bayreuth (district)